Dustin Roberts is an American politician who served as a member of the Oklahoma House of Representatives from the 21st district from 2010 to 2022. He retired from the Oklahoma House due to term limits. He is a member of the Choctaw Nation of Oklahoma.

In March 2022, he announced his campaign for the open congressional seat in Oklahoma's 2nd congressional district. He placed tenth in the primary.

Electoral history

References

External links

21st-century American politicians
21st-century Native American politicians
Candidates in the 2022 United States House of Representatives elections
Living people
Republican Party members of the Oklahoma House of Representatives
Choctaw Nation of Oklahoma state legislators in Oklahoma
People from Durant, Oklahoma
People from McAlester, Oklahoma
Year of birth missing (living people)